Defence for Children International (DCI) is an independent non-governmental organisation set up in 1979, during the International Year of the Child, to ensure on-going, practical, systematic and concerted international and national action specially directed towards promoting and protecting the rights of the child, as articulated in the United Nations Convention on the Rights of the Child (UNCRC). Nigel Cantwell was one of its founders and its current president is Khaled Quzmar of Palestine.

DCI's International Secretariat is located in Geneva, Switzerland.  It currently has 38 national sections and associated members and a representation at the United Nations Headquarters in New York.

DCI is active on a global, regional, national and local level. On a global level it focuses its efforts on lobbying, child rights advocacy, monitoring of the implementation of the UNCRC by State Parties and acting as a facilitator for the exchange of information and experience of its national sections. The national sections work on various child rights issues, adapting their focus to the specific needs of the children in their respective countries. Their main areas of work are child labour, juvenile justice, child prostitution, children in armed conflict and child rights' education.

As are other major human rights organisations, it is a member of the
Coalition to Stop the Use of Child Soldiers and Child Rights Information Network.

DCI has consultative status with the United Nations Economic and Social Council, UNICEF, UNESCO and the Council of Europe.

Defence for Children Palestine

Defense for Children International - Palestine (DCIP) is an independent, local Palestinian child rights organization established in 1991 to promote the rights of children living in the West Bank, including East Jerusalem and the Gaza Strip. It also investigates and documents human rights violations against children, provides legal services to children in urgent need.

In October 2021, Defence for Children Palestine was designated a terrorist organization by Israel, together with five other Palestinian non-profit, non-governmental organizations (Addameer, Al-Haq, Bisan Center for Research and Development, the Union of Palestinian Women's Committees and the Union of Agricultural Work Committees). The designation was condemned by Amnesty International, the Human Rights Watch, and the UN Office of the High Commissioner of Human Rights who called it a “frontal attack on the Palestinian human rights movement and on human rights everywhere.” In July 2022, nine EU countries (Belgium, Denmark, France, Germany, Ireland, Italy, the Netherlands, Spain and Sweden) issued a joint statement saying they will continue working with the six Palestinian organisations that Israel had banned because Israel had failed to prove that they should be considered terrorist groups. On 18 August 2022, Israeli forces raided the headquarters of the six organisations along with the Union of Health Work Committees (outlawed in 2020) in Ramallah and al-Bireh, removed computers and equipment and ordered their closure.

References

External links
 Defence for Children International

Children's rights organizations
Organizations established in 1979
International organisations based in Switzerland
Organisations based in Geneva